Ultimate Bill Evans is a compilation album by jazz musician, Bill Evans. All selections for this album were hand-picked by Herbie Hancock. The AllMusic review states that the Ultimate Bill Evans is a more than worthwhile introduction to Evans' mid-'60s work."

Track listing

All track information and credits were taken from the CD liner notes.

References

External links
Verve Records Official Site

1998 compilation albums
Bill Evans albums
Verve Records compilation albums